Suhuluceni is a commune in Teleneşti District, Moldova. It is composed of two villages, Ghermănești and Suhuluceni.

References

Communes of Telenești District